Richard D. Heinz (born May 30, 1955) is a Canadian former professional ice hockey player who played 47 games in the National Hockey League. He played with the St. Louis Blues and Vancouver Canucks. The rest of his career was spent in the minor leagues, primarily with the Salt Lake Golden Eagles in the Central Hockey League and International Hockey League.

Career statistics

Regular season and playoffs

References 
 

1955 births
Binghamton Whalers players
Canadian ice hockey goaltenders
Ice hockey people from Ontario
Living people
Minnesota Duluth Bulldogs men's ice hockey players
People from Essex, Ontario
Peoria Rivermen (IHL) players
Port Huron Flags (IHL) players
Salt Lake Golden Eagles (CHL) players
Salt Lake Golden Eagles (IHL) players
St. Louis Blues players
Undrafted National Hockey League players
Vancouver Canucks players
Canadian expatriate ice hockey players in the United States